King Zhao of Wei (died 277 BC), personal name Wei Chi was king of Wei from 296 BC to 277 BC. He was the son of King Xiang of Wei. During his reign, his state suffered from repeated attacks by the state of Qin. In 293 BC, he made an alliance with the state of Han against Qin but was defeated by the Qin general Bai Qi with the loss of 240,000 troops and 5 cities. In 287 BC, Quyang was attacked and in 286 BC, Anyi (the former capital of Wei) and Henei was attacked as well. In an attempt to assist in the attack on Anyi, Qin's ally, the state of Song was attacked in turn by the state of Qi and defeated at Wenyi (modern Wen County, Henan). After a brief alliance (285–284 BC) between the states of Yan, Qin, Han and Zhao against Qi (which was negotiated at the Zhou Dynasty capital, Luoyang), King Zhao broke the alliance and allied with Qi against Qin. 

Monarchs of Wei (state)
3rd-century BC Chinese monarchs